The Ontario Peninsula is the southernmost part of the province of Ontario, and of Canada as a whole. It is bounded by Lake Huron to the west, Lake Ontario to the east, and Lake Erie to the south. At its tip, it is separated from Michigan by the Detroit and St. Clair Rivers, as well as Lake St. Clair. A secondary peninsula projects toward New York on the eastern side, ending at the Niagara River.

The corner of the peninsula which lies on Lake Ontario is known as the Golden Horseshoe, and forms Canada's largest population centre. Other large cities include  London and Windsor.

Climate
Like other parts of southern Canada, the Ontario Peninsula enjoys warm or hot summers with normal thunderstorm activity, including severe thunderstorms that can have hail, damaging winds, and even tornadoes during peak season. It has cold winters, snowfall can be abundant, particularly in the affected snowbelt locations but there are many winter thaw periods breaking entrenched cold. The Ontario Peninsula has a humid continental climate, specifically, the majority of it falls into the Köppen climate classification Dfb, except for Essex County, parts of the Greater Toronto and Hamilton Area and the Niagara Peninsula are within the Dfa zone, but the entire peninsula is near the Dfa/Dfb borderline.

History

Anishinaabe tribes, particularly the Mississaugas, are indigenous to the Ontario Peninsula. Southern Ontario was colonized by France in the 1600s, but the British gained control of Ontario after the Seven Years' War.

The Ontario Peninsula experienced much of the fighting during the War of 1812, including Americans invading it and burning York (now called Toronto). After the war, population and trade boomed, and the Welland Canal was built.

When the British divided Canada into separate provinces, Toronto became the capital of Ontario. It eventually became Canada's main economic centre.

Most populous entities
By each definition, Toronto or its corresponding entity is the most populous not only in the Ontario Peninsula but in Canada as a whole.

Most populous metropolitan areas

Most populous municipalities

Most populous population centres

References

Geographic regions of Ontario
Peninsulas of Canada